Atteva charopis is a moth of the  family Attevidae. It is found in Australia.

External links
Australian Faunal Directory
CSIRO Entomology

Attevidae
Moths described in 1903